Tony Weston may refer to two English footballers:
Tony Weston (footballer, born 1946), former Gillingham F.C. player
Tony Weston (footballer, born 2003), current Rangers F.C. player